Inigo Gallo (2 November 1932 – 15 December 2000) was a Swiss comedian, radio personality, and stage and film actor starring usually in Swiss German language cinema and television and stage productions.

Life and work 
Born in Zürich, Canton of Zürich in Switzerland, Inigo Gallo had as a child actor appearances on Schauspielhaus Zürich, among other things as Walterli in Schiller's Wilhelm Tell. From 1948 to 1951 he was educated at the Bühnenstudio Zürich, and in 1951/52 Gallo got guest engagements at the Schauspielhaus Zürich, and from 1952 to 1958 engagements at the Stadttheater St. Gallen. In 1958 Gallo worked as a freelance director, actor and author, among others at the Stadttheater St. Gallen, Stadttheater Basel  and Schauspielhaus: in 1959 as Bunker Willy in Die kleine Niederdorf-Oper and in the musical "Eusi chliini Stadt" at the Theater am Hechtplatz in Zürich. Since then, Gallo worked together with Ruedi Walter in a variety of dialect plays and musicals, and with his later second wife and long-year stage partner Margrit Rainer. He directed, among other things his own Swiss German versions of farces like "Hurra, en Bueb!" "D'Mutter wott nur s'Bescht" and "Potz Millione", that became in 1980 a great success, touring with Margrit Rainer, Ruedi Walter, Gallo and Ines Torelli. After the death of Margrit Rainer, Gallo went further on tour with Walter, among others as Chauffeur Johann 'in Charles Lewinsky's production of "Drei Männer im Schnee", and Prof Dr Emil Burgholz  in Mary Chase 's adaptation "My Fründ Hanspi" (' 'Harvey' '). From 1972 Gallo also worked with the Bernhard-Theater Zürich in numerous Christmas musicals for children, usually under the direction of Jörg Schneider. In 1987 Gallo played Edouard Dindon in the successful Swiss premiere of Jerry Herman's musical "La Cage aux Folles", and has also appeared on Schauspielhaus in the world premiere of Urs Widmer's "Dr neu Noah ", followed by appearances on Atelier-Theater Bern, Sommertheater Winterthur, Bernhard Theater, Städtebundtheater Biel-Solothurn and Theater Fauteuil in Basel. In 2000 he participated in the production of Charles Lewinsky's "Ganz e Feini family" with, next to it in free productions. Since 1954, carried out numerous works for radio, film and television, including the recording of several Dialektschwänke with Gallo himself, Margrit Rainer and Ruedi Walter.

Awards 
 1993: Prix Bernhard by Bernhard-Theater Zürich for Georges in Poiret's "Der Narrenkäfig"
 1993: Prix Walo

Filmography (selected works) 
 2001: Studers erster Fall (Television film)
 2001: Kilimanjaro: How to spell Love!
 1995: Fascht e Familie (Television series, 1 episode) 
 1991: Mein Bruder, der Clown (Television film)
 1990: Klassäzämekunft 
 1983: ''Teddy Bär (1983) .... Dr. Traber 
 1982: Der Besuch der alten Dame (Television film) 
 1981: Der Erfinder (The Inventor) 
 1980: 
 1978: Last In, First Out (aka L'ordre et la sécurité du monde and Concorde Affair) 
 1976: The Swiss Conspiracy 
 1973–1975: Ein Fall für Männdli (Television series, 25 episodes) 
 1971: Professor Sound und die Pille - Die unwahrscheinliche Geschichte einer Erfindung (Television film)
 1969: Pfarrer Iseli 
 1966: The Strangler of the Tower 
 1961: Demokrat Läppli 
 1960: Wilhelm Tell
 1960:

Death 
Gallo died on December 15th, 2000, due to liver cancer.

Inigo Gallo was buried at Enzenbühl cemetery in Zürich-Weinegg alongside his wife and stage partner Margrit Rainer, and his wife from second marriage.

References

External links 

 
 Inigo Gallo on the website of the Swiss national television SRF 

1932 births
2000 deaths
Swiss male stage actors
Swiss male film actors
20th-century Swiss male actors
Male actors from Zürich
Oberweningen
People from Dielsdorf District
Kabarettists
Swiss male radio actors
Swiss comedians
Swiss male musical theatre actors
Swiss male television actors
Swiss male child actors
20th-century Swiss male singers
20th-century comedians